Franco José Vieira Neto (born November 11, 1966 in Fortaleza, Ceará) is a beach volleyball player from Brazil, who won the bronze medal in the men's beach team competition at the 1999 Pan American Games in Winnipeg, Manitoba, Canada, partnering Roberto Lopes. He represented his native country at the 1996 Summer Olympics in Atlanta, Georgia.

References

External links
 
 
 

1966 births
Living people
Brazilian men's beach volleyball players
Beach volleyball players at the 1996 Summer Olympics
Olympic beach volleyball players of Brazil
Beach volleyball players at the 1999 Pan American Games
Pan American Games bronze medalists for Brazil
Sportspeople from Fortaleza
Pan American Games medalists in volleyball
Medalists at the 1999 Pan American Games
20th-century Brazilian people